A list of films produced in Belgium ordered by year of release. For an alphabetical list of Belgian films see :Category:Belgian films

External links
 Belgian film at the Internet Movie Database

1990s
1990s in Belgium
Lists of 1990s films